Maxwell Greevey is a fictional character played by George Dzundza on NBC's long-running police procedural and legal drama television series Law & Order. Following Dzundza's departure from the cast at the end of the first season, Greevey was written off the series with his death in the second season premiere.

In Law & Order
Greevey is a homicide detective working in Manhattan's 27th Detective Squad. He was born in 1946 and began his career in the 1960s, partnered with Don Cragen (Dann Florek). By the beginning of the series, he is promoted to sergeant and partnered with Mike Logan (Chris Noth), with Cragen as their captain. He is very close to Logan, even while having authority over him, and provides his younger partner advice and someone in whom to confide.

Greevey is happily married to his wife Marie (Karen Shallo), with whom he has three children. Among them is his son Matthew. A conservative Irish Catholic, he sometimes looks down upon people, even murder victims, whose lifestyles conflict with his beliefs. For example, he requests to be taken off a case in which the victim was a bisexual man who practiced BDSM, and his opposition to abortion makes him uncomfortable investigating the bombing of a family planning clinic, which causes some friction with Logan, who is pro-choice. However, he seems at least tolerant of adultery, noting that while he himself has never cheated on his wife, "I don't judge. You can never know someone else's story".

Greevey also harbors an open distrust of doctors, which began after a doctor incorrectly diagnosed him with an inoperable brain tumor. After seeking a second opinion, he learned that it was actually a subdural hematoma, and recovered shortly thereafter.

Greevey carries a Smith & Wesson Model 36 revolver as his duty weapon. He draws it several times during the series, but never fires it.

Greevey's partner prior to Logan was killed in the line of duty during a traffic stop.

In the pilot episode, "Everybody's Favorite Bagman", Greevey is portrayed smoking cheap cigars; when the series was picked up, however, that characteristic was written out.

Departure

Dzundza was disappointed when he realized that Law & Order would be more of an ensemble show rather than a show starring him. Though the cast liked his portrayal of Greevey, they increasingly felt uncomfortable around Dzundza, who was also under stress from the constant commute between New York City and his home in Los Angeles. Dzundza quit after the first season of the show, making his last full appearance in the season finale, "The Blue Wall". In the opening scene of the second season premiere, "Confession", Greevey (played in the scene by an uncredited stunt double) is shot and killed by Daniel Magadan Jr. (Vyto Ruginis), the chief suspect in the murder of a whistleblower testifying against a corrupt labor union. He is succeeded by Sgt. Phil Cerreta (Paul Sorvino).

Greevey is the first detective within the Law & Order franchise to have been killed in the line of duty.

Along with Nina Cassady (Milena Govich), he is the second shortest serving detective in the series after Nick Falco (Michael Imperioli).

Connection to Law & Order: Special Victims Unit

Greevey is mentioned in a 2001 episode of the spinoff series Law & Order: Special Victims Unit. Prior to his death, Greevey and Cragen had worked on a case involving the murder of a college student named Jennifer Talmadge, and the disappearance of her infant son, Stephen. He took the case very seriously, working on it on his off time. After Greevey's death, Cragen took the case over and kept in touch with her parents. In the episode, Cragen, by now the head of the sex crimes unit, finds Stephen Talmadge while investigating a corrupt adoption agency. Cragen and his detectives later determine that the wife of Stephen's biological father killed Jennifer Talmadge and gave Stephen to the adoption agency. In the end, Stephen's biological father wins custody of him while at the same time making sure to keep Stephen's adoptive parents and biological grandparents in his life and his wife gets arrested shortly afterwards.

References

Law & Order characters
Television characters introduced in 1990
Fictional New York City Police Department sergeants
American male characters in television
Fictional murdered people
Fictional Irish American people
pt:Max Greevey